LFCC is a four-letter acronym that can stand for:

 Local Federal Coordinating Committee of the Combined Federal Campaign
 The ICAO code for Cahors - Lalbenque Airport in France
 Lord Fairfax Community College, Middletown, Virginia
 Low-Fat, Complex Carbohydrate
 London Fields Cricket Club
 London Film & Comic Con